Solenzo is a city located in the province of Banwa in Burkina Faso. It is the capital of Banwa Province. Bénéwendé Stanislas Sankara held his campaign's first official rally before the 2015 general election in Solenzo on November 8, 2015.

References

Populated places in the Boucle du Mouhoun Region
Banwa Province